The Beartooth Highway is an All-American Road in the western United States on a section of U.S. Route 212 in Montana and Wyoming between Red Lodge and the Northeast entrance of Yellowstone National Park. Because of heavy snowfall at the top, the pass is usually open for about five months per year, from mid-May to mid-October, weather conditions permitting.

Route description
The Beartooth Highway is the section of U.S. Route 212 between Red Lodge and Cooke City, Montana. It traces a series of steep zigzags and switchbacks, along the Montana–Wyoming border (45th parallel) to the  Beartooth Pass in Wyoming.

When driving east to west, the highest parts of the Beartooth Highway level off into a wide plateau near the top of the pass, then descend to the junction with Wyoming Highway 296 (Chief Joseph Scenic Byway) near Cooke City, the northeast gateway to Yellowstone National Park. On the way one passes numerous lakes typical of the Absaroka–Beartooth Wilderness which borders the highway along much of its route.

The highway officially opened June 14, 1936.

At this elevation and latitiude, snowstorms can occur even in the middle of the summer, and the pass is also known for strong winds and severe thunderstorms. Drivers should plan on a driving time of at least two hours for the  trip from Red Lodge to Cooke City, and it is advised to check with the Red Lodge Chamber of Commerce or the Beartooth Ranger District beforehand in case of road closures. Montana Traveler Information and Wyoming Travel Information Service both provide online information on Beartooth Highway travel conditions for their respective portions of the highway.

The Beartooth Highway passes through portions of Custer, Shoshone, and Gallatin national forests, and near the Absaroka–Beartooth Wilderness.

Despite this, and the U.S. highway number, and also connecting to state highway 296, it is not maintained by the Wyoming Department of Transportation or even the U.S. Forest Service, with WYDOT stating it does not meet standards for Wyoming state highways. It is instead maintained by the National Park Service, despite not being part of the park (like the Foothills Parkway or Skyline Drive) or being its own unit (like the Blue Ridge Parkway and Natchez Trace Parkway). The Montana Department of Transportation does maintain its portions in Custer and Gallatin national forests at the east and west ends of the highway, respectively.  

Neither MDT nor NPS perform snow removal except for once in the spring, typically in May, but sometimes not until June if there has been heavy snowfall.  Once the road opens, Beartooth Basin Ski Area opens near the state line at Beartooth Pass, for a short summer-only season that lasts until July.

History

In August 1872, the pass was crossed by Civil War General Philip Sheridan and 120 men returning from an inspection tour of Yellowstone National Park. Rather than take the long detour down the Clarks Fork Yellowstone River to return to Billings, Sheridan took the advice of an old hunter named Shuki Greer, who claimed intimate knowledge of the Beartooth Mountains. When the road was opened in 1936, it essentially followed Sheridan's route over the pass.

2005 closure
During the spring of 2005, several large mudslides and rockslides on May 19–20 damaged or destroyed the Montana side of the Beartooth Highway in a dozen places between mile markers 39 and 51. The road was closed for reconstruction, and a $20.4 million construction contract issued which stipulated an October 2005 completion date. Construction was completed ahead of schedule however the highway did not reopen for a year.
An estimated  of rock was removed from a  section of the highway near the top of the switchbacks, and construction crews drilled down to solid bedrock to create new supports for the road.

Major intersections

Gallery

References

Current Conditions
Montana Scenic Byway: Beartooth Highway
National Scenic Byways Project: Beartooth Highway, US Department of Transportation: National Scenic Highways Program.

External links

Beartooth Highway website
Historic American Engineering Record (HAER) documentation, filed under Cody vicinity, Park County, WY:

All-American Roads
Shoshone National Forest
National Forest Scenic Byways
Transportation in Carbon County, Montana
Transportation in Park County, Montana
Transportation in Park County, Wyoming
Historic American Engineering Record in Montana
Historic American Engineering Record in Wyoming